Vasilios Makridis (born March 27, 1939) is a retired Greek alpine skier who has competed at the 1964 Winter Olympics in Innsbruck, Austria. During his career, he has never taken part in competitions recognized by International Ski Federation. His best result was 56th place in slalom and he finished on 78th place in the giant slalom.

References

External links 
Vasilios Makridis at Sports Reference

1939 births
Living people
Greek male alpine skiers
Alpine skiers at the 1964 Winter Olympics
Olympic alpine skiers of Greece
Sportspeople from Veria